Centrolene pipilata, commonly known as the Amazon giant glass frog, is a species of frog in the family Centrolenidae.
It is endemic to Ecuador.
Its natural habitats are subtropical or tropical moist montane forests and rivers.
It is threatened by habitat loss.

References

Sources

pipilata
Amphibians of Ecuador
Taxonomy articles created by Polbot
Amphibians described in 1973